The Martin K. Dahl House is located in Waupun, Wisconsin.

History
Martin K. Dahl was a Norwegian immigrant blacksmith and investor in farmlands in Minnesota and Dakota, a civic leader, and the builder of the "first mansion" in Waupun, this house. It was listed on the National Register of Historic Places in 1975 and on the State Register of Historic Places in 1989.

References

Houses on the National Register of Historic Places in Wisconsin
National Register of Historic Places in Dodge County, Wisconsin
Houses in Dodge County, Wisconsin
Second Empire architecture in Wisconsin
Brick buildings and structures
Houses completed in 1879